"Can You Feel the Love Tonight" is a song from Disney's 1994 animated film The Lion King composed by English musician Elton John with lyrics by Tim Rice. Released as a single in May 1994, the song was a hit in the UK, peaking at number 14 on the UK Singles Chart, and achieved success in the United States, reaching number four on the Billboard Hot 100. The song was a number-one hit in Canada and France. At the 67th Academy Awards in March 1995, it won the Academy Award for Best Original Song. The same year, the song also won John the Grammy Award for Best Male Pop Vocal Performance.

Background and release
The song, written by Tim Rice and Elton John, was performed in the film by Kristle Edwards (also known as Kristle Murden), Joseph Williams, Sally Dworsky, Nathan Lane, and Ernie Sabella, while another version used in the film's closing credits was performed by Elton John. It won the 1994 Academy Award for Best Original Song, and the Golden Globe Award for Best Original Song. It also earned Elton John the Grammy Award for Best Male Pop Vocal Performance. The single version contains background vocals by Rick Astley, Gary Barlow and former collaborator Kiki Dee.

It was planned to be sung only by Timon and Pumbaa, but John disliked the comical nature of the concept as he declared that the song was meant to follow "Disney's tradition of great love songs", and that it could "express the lions' feelings for each other far better than dialogue could". The final result was the song mainly sung by an off-screen voice (Edwards) with short lines from Simba (Williams) and Nala (Dworsky), and the beginning and end parts by Timon (Lane) and Pumbaa (Sabella). It also included Zulu vocals that, while mostly muted in the on-screen version, were much more prominently featured in the audio-only releases.

Within around one and a half months before the film was released in June 1994, John's recording was released throughout radio stations as a commercial single and entered the US Billboard Hot 100. The music video of John's recording, directed by Matthew Amos, contains montages of John performing the song and scenes from the film.

In 2003, a remixed version of the song was included in the Special Edition soundtrack of The Lion King, again sung by Elton John. In the follow-up film, The Lion King 1½, the romantic scene where the song was originally featured also had the song playing, but with a difference: interspersed with the romantic scenes were short comedic shots of Timon and Pumbaa trying to disrupt Simba and Nala's night out with the "Peter Gunn Theme" playing while they try.

Reception
The single release of John's recording (the closing credits version) peaked at number one on the US Billboard Adult Contemporary chart for eight weeks. It also sold 500,000+ units in France.

Swedish Aftonbladet complimented "Can You Feel the Love Tonight" as a "really good ballad". AllMusic Heather Phares declared it as a "Lion King classic". Larry Flick from Billboard wrote, "John's distinctive voice slices through the quasi-orchestral tone of this power ballad. He taps into the song's pensive lyric, giving it a warm, human dimension that would be lost on a lesser performer." Troy J. Augusto from Cash Box commented, "From Hollywood’s The Lion King soundtrack comes the always welcome voice of Elton John, who takes a stab at reclaiming his talent for crossover hitmaking with this orchestrated ballad, his most affecting single choice in years." He added, "Moving performance and a heady theme add up to hits radio action as well the usual adult formats and even some classic rock attention. A winner." Howard Reich from Chicago Tribune called it "a swelling romantic ballad", and a proof of that "his songwriting holds echoes of an earlier era." Another editor, Michael Wilmington, complimented John as "one of the melodic hook-masters of the modern pop song, noting that when he plays and sings the ballad under the titles in the movie, "it seethes with pop romanticism." David Browne from Entertainment Weekly felt that John's croon and piano skills "are aging quite well". Another editor, Leah Greenblatt, described the song as a "soaring Simba tribute". 

A reviewer from Swedish Expressen called it a "typical Elton ballad with echoes of several of his old successes". Fell and Rufer from the Gavin Report said it is "sure-to-be a summer of '94 anthem." Another editor, Dave Sholin, declared it as a "beautiful ballad", adding, "It isn't too early to work on that acceptance speech for next year's Academy Awards, Elton." Alan Jones from Music Week gave it four out of five, calling it "a heavily orchestrated and dead slow ballad" and "one of Elton's more memorable recent melodies." The Network Forty complimented it as an "elegant ballad". A reviewer from People Magazine called it "sappy" and "sure to be song of the year". In 2016, David Ehrlich of the Rolling Stone magazine ranked John's performance of the song at the 67th Academy Awards in 1995 at number 12. Paul Jarvey from Telegram & Gazette wrote, "Although it's a simple song about the young cubs Simba and Nala, the tune advances the plot. The two cubs start as playful buddies. A spark of romance flashes when they meet later as full grown lions. The song defines the feelings of the two lions while indicating that changes may be in store for them and other animals in the kingdom." The Staffordshire Sentinel stated that the song "creates the perfect romantic atmosphere".

According to a 2020 survey by OnBuy found that couples that chose "Can You Feel The Love Tonight" as the song for the first dance at their wedding were more likely to stay together, with 77% of respondents who chose the song remaining in their marriage.

Track listing

Festival of the Lion King
In Walt Disney World's Animal Kingdom's Festival of the Lion King, the song is sung by Nakawa and Kibibi. As they sing, two ballet dancers (one male, one female) dressed as birds dance on the stage. After the main chorus is sung, the male bird dancer attaches his partner to a harness that allows her to fly through the air.

Personnel
 Elton John – piano, lead vocals
 Davey Johnstone – guitar
 Chuck Sabo – strings, drums
 Phil Spalding – bass
 Guy Babylon – keyboards
 Rick Astley, Gary Barlow, Kiki Dee – backing vocals

Charts

Weekly charts

Year-end charts

Decade-end charts

Certifications

Release history

See also
 List of number-one singles of 1994 (Canada)
 List of number-one hits of 1994 (France)
 List of number-one adult contemporary singles of 1994 (U.S.)

References

General

External links
  (official upload by DisneyMusicVEVO)
 "Can You Feel the Love Tonight" composed by Elton John Piano sheet music | pdf

1990s ballads
1994 singles
1994 songs
Best Original Song Academy Award-winning songs
Best Original Song Golden Globe winning songs
Beyoncé songs
Disney Renaissance songs
Donald Glover songs
Elton John songs
Grammy Award for Best Male Pop Vocal Performance
Hollywood Records singles
Love themes
Mercury Records singles
Pop ballads
RPM Top Singles number-one singles
SNEP Top Singles number-one singles
Song recordings produced by Chris Thomas (record producer)
Songs from The Lion King (franchise)
Songs with lyrics by Tim Rice
Songs with music by Elton John